Jamie Adams (born 26 August 1987 in Stranraer) is a Scottish former football player.

Club career

Kilmarnock
Adams was a product of Kilmarnock's youth system, signing for the club in the summer of 2004. He was loaned to Queen of the South as part of a deal in which Kilmarnock signed Queen's Willie Gibson in January 2007. While with Queen of the South he was involved in a controversial event, which later resulted in the Dumfries club being fined by the Scottish Football Association.

Adams was played by manager Ian McCall in two Scottish Cup ties for Queens when "cup-tied" (ineligible), having already been listed as a substitute for Kilmarnock in their 3rd round defeat by Morton. The resultant SFA fine was reported to be £20,000.

Adams subsequently joined Queens for a second loan spell in the first half of the 2007–08 season and a third spell in July 2008.

Adams suffered two cruciate ligament knee injuries during those loan spells at Queen of the South. He endured lengthy spells on the sidelines on both occasions but obtained excellent rehabilitation treatment to get back to full fitness.

After returning to fitness, Adams joined Partick Thistle in an emergency loan deal from November 2009 until January 2010.

He returned to Kilmarnock, at the end of the January 2010 transfer window, and appeared as a second-half substitute on 20 February 2010 versus St Mirren in a Scottish Premier League match at Rugby Park in a 1–1 draw. He subsequently joined Queens on loan for a fourth spell in March 2010 until the end of the 2009–10 season.

St Johnstone
Adams was out of contract with Kilmarnock in May 2010 and he signed for St Johnstone on a two-year deal.

Wigtown & Bladnoch
Adams signed for South of Scotland League Champions Wigtown & Bladnoch in October 2014 after three years out. Playing alongside his friends was said to be a major factor in signing. He started as a trialist in a Wigtownshire Derby against Newton Stewart in September and didn't play again until signing. In his debut he went on to score one of the four goals in a 4–0 rout of St Cuthbert Wanderers. In his third game for Wigtown he scored a penalty to level the game at 1–1 and also scored the decisive penalty in the shoot-out as Wigtown went on to beat Fleet Star to reach the Haig Gordon Cup Final for the third consecutive season.

At the South of Scotland League Awards Ceremony, Adams was named in the Team of the Year.

Ayr United
In July 2015, Adams signed for Ayr United on a six-month deal following an impressive trial period. Adams helped Ayr win promotion to the Scottish Championship twice during his five seasons with the club. He retired from playing football in January 2020 due to injury.

International career
Jamie Adams was a member of the Scotland squad at the 2006 European U-19 Championships. Adams played in the final as Scotland lost 2–1 to Spain on 29 July 2006 to finish runners-up.

Career statistics

References

External links

1987 births
Living people
People from Stranraer
Scottish footballers
Kilmarnock F.C. players
Queen of the South F.C. players
Partick Thistle F.C. players
St Johnstone F.C. players
Scottish Premier League players
Scottish Football League players
People educated at Stranraer Academy
Dundee F.C. players
Ayr United F.C. players
Association football midfielders
Scotland youth international footballers
Footballers from Dumfries and Galloway
Scotland under-21 international footballers
Wigtown & Bladnoch F.C. players
Scottish Professional Football League players